The Almirante Lynch class was a pair of two torpedo gunboats,  and , ordered for the Chilean Navy in the late 1880s.

Ships

See also

References
 
 
 
 

Torpedo gunboat classes
Almirante Lynch-class torpedo gunboats